George Harrison Schaeffer was an American football player, coach of football, basketball, and baseball, and college athletics administrator. He served as the head football coach at Tempe Normal School, now Arizona State University, from 1914 to 1916, compiling a record of 7–8. Schaeffer was also the head basketball coach at Tempe Normal for the 1914–15 and 1916–17 seasons and the school's baseball coach from 1915 to 1917. He played football at Gettysburg College, graduating in 1914, and also attended Pennsylvania State College.

Head coaching record

Football

References

Year of birth missing
Year of death missing
Arizona State Sun Devils athletic directors
Arizona State Sun Devils baseball coaches
Arizona State Sun Devils football coaches
Arizona State Sun Devils men's basketball coaches
Gettysburg Bullets football players
Pennsylvania State University alumni